Tsukiuta (Stylised: Tsukiuta.) is a character CD series which started as a collaboration between Vocaloid producers and popular voice actors, but expanded into a media franchise with its own animation, multiple stage plays, manga anthologies, video games, and merchandise.

Characters
The characters of Tsukiuta are split into four idol groups under the fictional Tsukino Talent Production. There are twelve men and twelve women, each representing a month of the year. Tsukino Talent Production also manages the fictional idol groups under TsukiPro.

The men are split into rival units named Six Gravity and Procellarum. The members of Six Gravity come from Eastern Japan, while the members of Procellarum come from Western Japan.

The women belong to the units Fluna and Seleas. They are goddesses from a different dimension, unknown to anyone on Earth.

Six Gravity

 / Composition by Satsuki ga Tenkomori
Month- December
 A member of Six Gravity. With a cheerful and happy attitude, he gets along well with his team members along with the members of Procellarum.

 / Composition by Machigerita, Misato Murai (childhoood)
Month- January
The leader of Six Gravity. Often called 'King' by those around him due to having a commanding, charismatic presence beyond his age. Although he is a man of few words, he can be blunt and sarcastic but does not act out of spite. He possesses a high intellect and physical strength, and is able to crush an apple with his bare hands. Proficient in a wide range of martial arts, Hajime is the only son of the prominent Mutsuki family of Eastern Japan. A childish side of Hajime surfaces when the oldest members assemble. Part of the oldest pair with March's Yayoi Haru.

 / Composition by NijiharaPeperon
Month- February
The pink-haired member of Six Gravity. He represents the month of February. Koi is the twin-brother of Kisaragi Ai, who also represents the month of February.

 / Composition by Yuuyu
Month- March

 / Composition by ChouchouP
Month- April

 / Composition by Nem
Month- May
Also known by the nicknames "Gravi's prince" and "Refreshing Prince" due to his princely charm.
He is the childhood friend of Uduki Arata and has been hinted to be very good-looking. He has platinum blonde hair and sky blue eyes. His elder brother is Satsuki Chihiro. He is 17 years old in the first season of the anime. He is part of Six Gravity's middle pair along with his best friend Arata. Ao's hobbies include watching movies, reading books, and baking. He is generally quite level-headed and mature but also has a cute childish side. His name means "hollyhock" and can also mean "blue" if written in a different way. He smiles a lot and is often seen with his smartphone. His character theme color is light blue.

Procellarum

 / Composition by Yuyoyuppe
Month- June
Rui is innocent and naive, to the point that Shimotsuki Shun has (somewhat negatively) influenced his way of thinking. However, he can also do rather unexpected things whilst maintaining a straight face. He possesses a unique worldview, which makes him nonreactive to things such as scary stories. Rui possesses a natural talent for music, particularly the piano, and has participated in national and international competitions from childhood. However, following a discord with his older brother, Rei, who did not possess the same music talent as Rui, as well as disagreements with his parents involving his musical career as a pianist, Rui has run away from home, was picked up by Fuduki Kai and had been living with him until they were scouted. He was scouted due to Kai (who had been scouted while helping out with some people moving into the talent production's dorms) showing the talent company a picture of Rui, who had just woken up, looking out-of-focus, and said company encouraged Kai to bring Rui along to become an idol.

 / Composition by Hitoshizuku x Yama△
Month- July 
A member of Procellarum representing the month of July. Kai is most known for his liveliness and big heart, making him popular and respected. Being the eldest son among six siblings, Kai has developed a natural 'big-brother'-like personality, and has a habit of patting everyone on the head. He is naturally welcoming and accepting, although according to Haduki You, he can end up pampering others too much, especially Procellarum's leader. Kai is known for being a jack-of-all-trades, as well as a very reliable person. Kai aims to become self-reliant, previously living off connections he has made through his part-time jobs and living on his own, prior to taking in Minaduki Rui, who treats as his own son and worries about often. Additionally, Kai enjoys physical activities and work, such as fishing and exploration.

 / Composition by UtataP
Month- August
You is known to others as someone who puts women above men. With this, he is quite good with women, and is popular among them. You is free-spirited, unrestrained, and laid-back. He can also be very vague, the kind of person who ends up toying with others and causing them trouble. However, while he appears to be flashy and troublesome, he possesses a strong sense of duty and a one-track mind, although according to him, he would rather die than show that side of him. He also possesses a unique worldview and sense of beauty. He and Nagatsuki Yoru were both childhood friends who got scouted together.

 / Composition by John
Month- September
Yoru is an idol of the unit Procellarum under Tsukino Talent Production. He is a 22-year old male with dark brown hair and blue eyes. With a slender body and narrowed shoulders, his body fits in women's clothing better than in men's clothing. His personality is mature, sincere and earnest. Yoru has a high level of femininity and is good at cooking due to his mother. He received the title and name of "Procellarum's Mother" as he is usually seen in the kitchen, preparing food for his fellow members as well as those of Six Gravity. He and Haduki You were both childhood friends who got scouted together.

 / Composition by takamatt
Month- October
Iku is lively, and athletic, preferring to be constantly in motion compared to staying still. He is the type who always looks forward and remains aware of those around him. He also exudes a natural aura of masculinity. Compared to the other idols, Iku comes from a comparatively normal family. He possess a normal type of common sense, making him and Haduki You the ones in charge of throwing retorts at his fellow idols' antics. Due to being the only member who decided to keep participating in clubs, as well as having to commute a lot, he ends up being very busy, but manages his time professionally.

 / Composition by Kikuo
Month- November
The leader of Procellarum. A self proclaimed 'Demon Lord' who leads the unit with a mysterious charisma, despite claiming his reluctance to work. His profound smile adds to his peculiar nature but he is intelligent, able to memorize a book after only one reading. He has been shown to exhibit a various amount of magical abilities, including ice magic. Shun is a big fan of Six Gravity's leader, Hajime Mutsuki, and holds the latter's fanclub card, entitled "Honorary Member No. 6". Being the only son of the prominent Shimotsuki family of Western Japan, he has grown up to be quite pampered and shows no motivation for work or manual labor. Part of the oldest pair with July's Fuduki Kai.

Fluna

 / Composition by Satsuki ga Tenkomori
Month- December

 / Composition by Machigerita
Month- January

 / Composition by NijiharaPeperon
Month- February

 / Composition by Yuuyu
Month- March

 / Composition by ChouchouP
Month- April

 / Composition by Nem
Month- May

Seleas

 / Composition by Yuyoyuppe
Month- June

 / Composition by Hitoshizuku x Yama△
Month- July

 / Composition by UtataP
Month- August

 / Composition by Jun
Month- September

 / Composition by takamatt
Month- October

 / Composition by Kikuo
Month- November

Other characters

Managers

Six Gravity's manager.

Procellarum's manager.

Other 

The president of Tsukino Talent Production and the producer for Six Gravity and Procellarum.

Media

Anime
An anime for the series was announced at Animate Girls Festival 2014. The anime titled  (shortened as ), aired between July and September 2016 on Tokyo MX, BS11 and several other TV channels.

The anime was produced in celebration of Animate's 30th anniversary. The anime focuses on the members of Six Gravity and Procellarum, with a different character being the main focus of each episode. The character's name is incorporated into the title of the episode.

On November 9, 2018, it was announced that the series would receive a second season. The second season is animated by Children's Playground Entertainment, with Yukio Nishimoto replacing Itsuro Kawasaki as director and Natsuko Takahashi replacing Itsuro Kawasaki as script supervisor. The rest of the cast reprised their roles. Originally set to premiere in 2019, it was pushed to April 2020, and delayed again to July 2020 due to the effects of the COVID-19 pandemic, but was delayed again to air from October 7 to December 30, 2020. Funimation acquired the series, and streams the series on its website in North America and the British Isles. On November 11, 2020, the company apologized for the poor quality of the sixth episode of Season 2.

Film
On April 3, 2022, it was announced that the series would be receiving an anime film titled Rabbits Kingdom the Movie. It is set to premiere in December 2023.

Music
The opening theme alternates between GRAVATIC-LOVE by Six Gravity and LOLV –Lots of Love- by Procellarum.
The ending themes are sung by each character in the order of their representative months, starting with December.

Episodes

Season 1

Season 2

Stage Play

2.5 Dimension Dance Live "Tsukiuta." Stage 
2.5 Dimension Dance Live "Tsukiuta." Stage (Japanese: 2.5次元ダンスライブ「ツキウタ。」ステージ, 2.5-jigen Dansu Raibu "Tsukiuta". Suteeji) was the first stage play of the Tsukiuta. series and ran between April 23 to May 1, 2016, at Seiryokaikan Hall, Japan. It alternated between “ver. Black” which featured Six Gravity, and “ver. White” which featured Procellarum.

2.5 Dimension Dance Live "Tsukiuta." Stage: Act II: ~The Legend of Tsukiuta: "Yumemigusa"~ 
2.5 Dimension Dance Live "Tsukiuta." Stage: Act II: ~The Legend of Tsukiuta: "Yumemigusa"~ (Japanese: 2.5次元ダンスライブ「ツキウタ。」ステージ 第二幕 ～月歌奇譚「夢見草」～, 2.5-jigen Dansu Raibu "Tsukiuta". Suteeji Dai-ni-maku ~Tsukiuta Kitan "Yumemigusa"~) is the second instalment of the stage play series of Tsukiuta. It was held in Roppongi Blue Theatre during October 27 to 31, 2016. Two versions of the show were performed once per day; the Sakura Chapter (桜の章, sakura-no-shou) with more focus on Six Gravity members Arata and Aoi and the Moon Chapter (月の章, tsuki-no-shou), centralising Procellarum's You and Yoru. All members of the cast were featured in these performances.

2.5 Dimension Dance Live "Tsukiuta." Stage Tri! School Revolution! 
2.5 Dimension Dance Live "Tsukiuta." Stage Tri! School Revolution! (Japanese: 2.5次元ダンスライブ「ツキウタ。」ステージ Tri! School Revolution!, 2.5-jigen Dansu Raibu "Tsukiuta". Suteeji Tri! School Revolution!) is the third in the stage play series of Tsukiuta. Similar to the first stage, two versions were produced, ver. Black featuring Six Gravity (Kakeru and Koi) and ver. White with Procellarum (Shun and Kai). Ver. Black was held at Roppongi Blue Theatre during March 8 to 12, 2017. Ver. White was shown at Hakuhinkan Theatre during March 17 to 26, 2017.

2.5 Dimension Dance Live "Tsukiuta." Stage: Lunatic Party 
2.5 Dimension Dance Live "Tsukiuta." Stage: Lunatic Party (Japanese: 2.5次元ダンスライブ「ツキウタ。」ステージ 第4幕『Lunatic Party』, 2.5-jigen Dansu Raibu "Tsukiuta". Suteeji Dai-4-maku "Lunatic Party") is the upcoming 4th instalment of the Tsukiuta. stage play series. It is scheduled to be held at Roppongi Blue Theatre from October 11 to 15. Arata Uduki's actor will be replaced by Ryouhei Takanaka.

Cast
The initial cast, along with the staff, venue and performance dates, was announced by Animate.

Games

Mobile
There were two mobile applications for Tsukiuta. – Tsukino Park, an application featuring mini games and media release information; and Tsukino Paradise (Tsukipara.), a rhythm game published by Bandai Namco Entertainment. Both mobile games also featured characters from the other groups under TsukiPro. The two games were available on both iOS and Android.
Tsukino Park was discontinued on November 30, 2018.
Tsukino Paradise was discontinued on February 5, 2020.

PS Vita
A PlayStation Vita game titled Tsukitomo. -Tsukiuta. 12 memories- (ツキトモ。- Tsukiuta. 12 memories-) was released on June 1, 2017. Unlike the mobile games, the Vita game solely features the Tsukiuta. groups of Six Gravity and Procellarum. The game was released both as a packaged version and as a digital download, with Animate receiving a limited edition which included physical goods and extra downloadable content.

Discography

Singles

Solo Singles

Duet Singles

Unit Singles

Albums

Drama CDs

References
 animeonegai.com

External links

 Tsukiuta. Official Site 
 

2.5D musicals
Album series
Anime postponed due to the COVID-19 pandemic
Ichijinsha manga
Japan-exclusive video games
Japanese idols in anime and manga
Musicals based on anime and manga
Pierrot (company)